The 2014–2015 season is HB Køge's sixth season since formation in 2009, with the merger of Herfølge Boldklub and Køge Boldklub, and is representing the club's third consecutive season in 1st Division.

Match results

Pre-season friendlies

1st Division 2014–15

July

August

September

Danish Cup 2014–15

Player statistics

Squad

Appearances and goals

|}

Top scorers

Disciplinary record

References

HB Køge seasons
HB Koge